"So Hard" is a song by English synth-pop duo Pet Shop Boys, released in September 1990 as the lead single from their fourth studio album, Behaviour (1990). The song is about "two people living together; they are totally unfaithful to each other but they both pretend they are faithful and then catch each other out". It peaked at  4 in the United Kingdom and reached the top three in at least seven European countries, including Finland, where it reached No. 1.

Background
"The original was harping back to Giorgio Moroder with loads of all these retro instruments", recalled Chris Lowe. "Then David Morales took the chord progression from the middle section and made this classic pumping house track. It's quite funny, because we did this gig in Los Angeles and Frankie Knuckles played this track at the party afterwards. Neil came over and said, 'Why don't we make records like this?' I said, 'Neil, it is us.' So that's how much we know about dance music!"

Critical reception
Larry Flick from Billboard felt that "So Hard" "maintains the fun and frothy disco melodrama of past efforts, while striking enough of a modern pop stance to encourage alternative and top 40 radio airplay." James Muretich from Calgary Herald said the song, "about a couple faithfully unfaithful to each other", "reflect a detached sadness set against a dreamy synthesizer background that barely sashays across the dancefloor." Liverpool Echo stated, "It might be called "So Hard" but the Pet Shop Boys make it all sound so easy. That's probably why people think they're too clever for their own good. But they do make excellent pop records. This is typical Pet Shop Boys despite the change of producer: Brash disco backing, dry sophisticated singing and a great tune." 

Paul Lester from Melody Maker named it Single of the Week, writing, "Notwithstanding the radar signals, laser beams and acidic bleeps which squiggle at the start, "So Hard" is immediately, unmistakably Pet Shop Boys." Pan-European magazine Music & Media commented, "All radio formats unite! This commercial pop single - featuring that typically inescapable chorus - is the logical choice for any sensible programmer." Nick Robinson from Music Week said, "A welcome return, this time with Harold 'Axel F' Faltermeyer co-producing, and a typical semi-orchestral pop song with those familiar heavy dance beats and another catchy chorus." Roger Morton from NME wrote that "So Hard" is "familiar Pet Shoppies territory", with its "superior hit factory pulse, boys town keyboard slashes and darkly tainted love-lyric."

Music video
The accompanying music video for the song was directed by Eric Watson and filmed in Newcastle and North Tyneside. Filming locations included the Bigg Market, Newcastle Quayside, Railway Terrace in Wallsend, Byker, Whitley Bay and the Tyne and Wear Metro. The black and white video co-stars Paul Gascoigne's sister Anna Gascoigne. The video also shows people dancing and having fun on the streets with Neil and Chris in the background.

Track listing
The single's B-side is "It Must Be Obvious", with the US release also featuring the remix of "Paninaro", which was originally released on Disco. Remixes were done by Julian Mendelsohn, the KLF and David Morales. The KLF remixed "So Hard" and "It Must Be Obvious", available on the "So Hard (The KLF vs Pet Shop Boys)" single.

 Standard 7-inch and cassette single
 "So Hard" – 3:56
 "It Must Be Obvious" – 4:21

 UK 12-inch single
A1. "So Hard" (extended dance mix) – 6:30
A2. "It Must Be Obvious" – 4:21
B1. "So Hard" (dub mix) – 7:30

 UK 12-inch single (The KLF vs Pet Shop Boys)
A. "So Hard" (The KLF vs. Pet Shop Boys) – 5:27
B. "It Must Be Obvious" (UFO mix) – 9:22

 UK CD single
 "So Hard" – 3:56
 "It Must Be Obvious" – 4:21
 "So Hard" (extended dance mix) – 6:30

 German maxi-CD single
 "So Hard" (12-inch remix) – 6:13
 "So Hard" (radio mix) – 3:22
 "So Hard" (Red Zone mix) – 6:45
 "So Hard" (Eclipse mix) – 3:40

 US 12-inch and maxi-cassette single
A1. "So Hard" (extended dance mix) – 6:30
A2. "So Hard" (single) – 3:56
B1. "So Hard" (dub) – 7:30
B2. "It Must Be Obvious" – 4:21

 US maxi-CD single
 "So Hard" (extended dance mix) – 6:30
 "So Hard" (single) – 3:56
 "So Hard" (dub) – 7:30
 "It Must Be Obvious" – 4:21
 "Paninaro" (12-inch remix) – 8:40

Charts

Weekly charts

Year-end charts

Cover versions
A cover version by Scottish musician Momus was included on the 2001 compilation Very Introspective, Actually: A Tribute to the Pet Shop Boys.

References

1990 singles
1990 songs
Number-one singles in Finland
Parlophone singles
Pet Shop Boys songs
Song recordings produced by Harold Faltermeyer
Songs written by Chris Lowe
Songs written by Neil Tennant
Black-and-white music videos